Ric R. Roman (September 29, 1916 – August 11, 2000) was an American actor. He was perhaps best known for his roles in the films Lone Star (1952), Shadows of Tombstone (1953), Lizzie (1957) and The Wayward Girl (1957). He also appeared in a number of television series, notably Zorro (1957–1959) and Batman (year two, episodes 29 and 30).

Filmography

Film

Television

References

Bibliography
 Lentz, Robert. Gloria Grahame, Bad Girl of Film Noir: The Complete Career. McFarland, 2011.

External links

1916 births
2000 deaths
American male film actors
American male television actors
20th-century American male actors